AN-788, also known  as NSD-788, is an experimental medication which was originated by NeuroSearch and is under development by Aniona and Saniona for the treatment of major depressive disorder. It was also under development for anxiety disorders, but development for this indication was discontinued. The drug acts as a serotonin–dopamine reuptake inhibitor (SDRI). As of November of 2018, it is in an agreement for phase II clinical trials for major depressive disorder.

See also
 List of investigational antidepressants

References

Antidepressants
Anxiolytics
Drugs with undisclosed chemical structures
Experimental drugs
Serotonin–dopamine reuptake inhibitors